Devon County may refer to:
 Devon, England, United Kingdom
 the former name of Devon Land District, Tasmania, Australia